Northwest Regional style architecture is an architectural style popular in the Pacific Northwest between 1935 and 1960. It is a regional variant of the International style. It is defined by the extensive use of unpainted wood in both interiors and exteriors. Other features of the style include integration of the building with its setting through asymmetrical floor plans, extensive use of glass extending to the floor, a low-pitched or flat roof of shingles with overhanging eaves, and a minimum of decoration. It is sometimes known as Northwest Modern.

The style was developed by architects including Paul Thiry in Seattle and John Yeon in Oregon,  and was used most often in residential buildings. Other proponents of the style included Paul Hayden Kirk, Pietro Belluschi, John Storrs, Van Evera Bailey, Herman Brookman, and Saul Zaik.

Notable examples

Some examples of Northwest Regional style include the Harry F. Wentz Studio on the Oregon coast, and the Museum of Contemporary Craft, John Yeon Speculative House, Aubrey R. Watzek House, Zion Lutheran Church, and Visitors Information Center in Portland. Seattle examples include the Northeast Branch Library by Thiry, University of Washington Faculty Club, and University Unitarian Church.

See also
Arthur Erickson
Mid-century modern
Pacific lodge
William Wurster

References

External links
Saul Zaik The Dean of Portland Architects
Saul Zaik's Homes, Past and Present

American architectural styles
House styles
Oregon culture
Culture of the Pacific Northwest